Van Bibber Lake is an unincorporated community and census-designated place in Clinton Township, Putnam County, in the U.S. state of Indiana. Its population was 485 as of the 2010 census. The community is located on the shores of Glenn Flint Lake and its namesake lake.

Geography

Demographics

References

Census-designated places in Indiana
Census-designated places in Putnam County, Indiana